Sailing at the 2016 Summer Paralympics in Rio de Janeiro took place between 12 and 17 September 2016 in Marina da Glória, Copacabana. 80 competitors, 11 of which were female, competed in three keelboat classes. Three sailing events will be held. All were mixed events, meaning that men and women can compete together.

Classification

International disability classification in sailing is done by a committee, which gives each competitor a number score with lower numbers corresponding to more severe disability. Sailors are classified under the IFDS Functional Classification System. To take part in Paralympic sailing, an athlete must have a score of 7 or less.

Qualification

There are three main routes of qualification. The 2014 IFDS Sailing World Championships provide the first opportunity, gaining places for just over half of the quota places. The 2015 Combined World Championships provide the bulk of the remaining places, while 6 places are reserved for the host country. Each National Paralympic Committee may enter a maximum of one boat per event.

Schedule

The three sailing events are held simultaneously across six days of competition, with medals decided on the final day of sailing.

Results

Medal table

Norlin Mark 3 / 2.4 Metre

Skud 18

Sonar

References

External links
Official site of the 2016 Summer Paralympics 
IFDS - International Association for Disabled Sailing
ISAF - International Sailing Federation

 
2016 Summer Paralympics events
Paralympics
Sailing competitions in Brazil